Textus Receptus (Latin: "received text") refers to all printed editions of the Greek New Testament from Erasmus's Novum Instrumentum omne (1516) to the 1633 Elzevir edition. It was the most commonly used text type for Protestant denominations. 

The Textus Receptus constituted the translation-base for the original German Luther Bible, the translation of the New Testament into English by William Tyndale, the King James Version, the Spanish Reina-Valera translation, the Czech Bible of Kralice, the Portuguese Almeida Recebida, and most Reformation-era New Testament translations throughout Western and Central Europe. The text originated with the first printed Greek New Testament, published in 1516, a work undertaken in Basel by the Dutch Catholic scholar, priest and monk Desiderius Erasmus.

History 
 
 
Erasmus had been working for years on two projects: a collation of Greek texts and a fresh Latin New Testament. In 1512, he began his work on the Latin New Testament. He collected all the Vulgate manuscripts that he could find to create a critical edition. Then, he polished the Latin, declaring, "It is only fair that Paul should address the Romans in somewhat better Latin." In the earlier phases of the project, he never mentioned a Greek text: "My mind is so excited at the thought of emending Jerome’s text, with notes, that I seem to myself inspired by some god. I have already almost finished emending him by collating a large number of ancient manuscripts, and this I am doing at enormous personal expense."

While his intentions for publishing a fresh Latin translation are clear, it is less clear why he included the Greek text. Some speculate that he intended on producing a critical Greek text or that he wanted to beat the Complutensian Polyglot into print, but there is no evidence to support these speculations. Rather, his motivation may have been simpler: he included the Greek text to prove the superiority of his Latin version. He wrote, "There remains the New Testament translated by me, with the Greek facing, and notes on it by me." He further demonstrated the reason for the inclusion of the Greek text when defending his work: "But one thing the facts cry out, and it can be clear, as they say, even to a blind man, that often through the translator's clumsiness or inattention the Greek has been wrongly rendered; often the true and genuine reading has been corrupted by ignorant scribes, which we see happen every day, or altered by scribes who are half-taught and half-asleep." Erasmus's new work was published by Froben of Basel in 1516, becoming the first published Greek New Testament, the Novum Instrumentum omne, diligenter ab Erasmo Rot. Recognitum et Emendatum. He used manuscripts: 1, 1rK, 2e, 2ap, 4ap, 7, 817.

Typographical errors, attributed to the rush to complete the work, abounded in the published text. Erasmus also lacked a complete copy of the Book of Revelation and translated the last six verses back into Greek from the Latin Vulgate to finish his edition. Erasmus adjusted the text in many places to correspond with readings found in the Vulgate or as quoted in the Church Fathers; consequently, although the Textus Receptus is classified by scholars as a late Byzantine text, it differs in nearly 2,000 readings from the standard form of that text-type, as represented by the "Majority Text" of Hodges and Farstad (Wallace, 1989). The edition was a sell-out commercial success and was reprinted in 1519, with most but not all of the typographical errors corrected.

Erasmus had been studying Greek New Testament manuscripts for many years, in the Netherlands, France, England and Switzerland, noting their many variants, but had only six Greek manuscripts immediately accessible to him in Basel. They all dated from the 12th century or later, and only one came from outside the mainstream Byzantine tradition. Consequently, most modern scholars consider his text to be of dubious quality.

With the third edition of Erasmus's Greek text (1522) the Comma Johanneum was included because "Erasmus chose to avoid any occasion for slander rather than persisting in philological accuracy" even though he remained "convinced that it did not belong to the original text of l John." Popular demand for Greek New Testaments led to a flurry of further authorized and unauthorized editions in the early sixteenth century, almost all of which were based on Erasmus's work and incorporated his particular readings but typically also making a number of minor changes of their own.

Robert Estienne, known as Stephanus (1503–1559), a printer from Paris, edited the Greek New Testament four times, in 1546, 1549, 1550 and 1551, the last in Geneva. The edition of 1551 contains the Latin translation of Erasmus and the Vulgate.

The origin of the term Textus Receptus comes from the publisher's preface to the 1633 edition produced by Bonaventure and his nephew Abraham Elzevir who were partners in a printing business at Leiden. The preface reads, Textum ergo habes, nunc ab omnibus receptum: in quo nihil immutatum aut corruptum damus ("so you hold the text, now received by all, in which (is) nothing corrupt"). The two words textum and receptum were modified from the accusative to the nominative case to render textus receptus. Over time, that term has been retroactively applied to Erasmus's editions, as his work served as the basis of the others.

Textual criticism 

John Mill (1645–1707) collated textual variants from 82 Greek manuscripts. In his Novum Testamentum Graecum, cum lectionibus variantibus MSS (Oxford 1707) he reprinted the unchanged text of the Editio Regia, but in the index he enumerated 30,000 textual variants.

Shortly after Mill published his edition, Daniel Whitby (1638–1725) attacked his work by asserting that the text of the New Testament had never been corrupted and thus equated autographs with the Textus Receptus. He considered the 30,000 variants in Mill's edition a danger to Holy Scripture and called for defending the Textus Receptus against these variants.

Johann Albrecht Bengel (1687–1752) edited in 1725 Prodromus Novi Testamenti Graeci Rectè Cautèque Adornandi and in 1734 Novum Testamentum Graecum. Bengel divided manuscripts into families and subfamilies and favoured the principle of lectio difficilior potior ("the more difficult reading is the stronger").

Johann Jakob Wettstein's apparatus was fuller than that of any previous editor. He introduced the practice of indicating the ancient manuscripts by capital Roman letters and the later manuscripts by Arabic numerals. He published in Basel Prolegomena ad Novi Testamenti Graeci (1731).

J. J. Griesbach (1745–1812) combined the principles of Bengel and Wettstein. He enlarged the Apparatus by considering more citations from the Fathers, and various versions, such as the Gothic, the Armenian, and the Philoxenian. Griesbach distinguished a Western, an Alexandrian, and a Byzantine Recension. Christian Frederick Matthaei (1744–1811) was a Griesbach opponent.

Karl Lachmann (1793–1851) was the first who broke with the Textus Receptus. His object was to restore the text to the form in which it had been read in the Ancient Church in about AD 380. He used the oldest known Greek and Latin manuscripts.

Constantin von Tischendorf's Editio Octava Critica Maior was based on Codex Sinaiticus.

Westcott and Hort published The New Testament in the Original Greek in 1881 in which they rejected what they considered to be the dated and inadequate Textus Receptus. Their text is based mainly on Codex Vaticanus in the Gospels.

Defense 
Frederick von Nolan, a 19th-century historian and Greek and Latin scholar, spent 28 years attempting to trace the Textus Receptus to apostolic origins. He was an ardent advocate of the supremacy of the Textus Receptus over all other editions of the Greek New Testament, and he argued that the first editors of the printed Greek New Testament intentionally selected those texts because of their superiority and disregarded other texts, which represented other text-types because of their inferiority.

It is not to be conceived that the original editors of the [Greek] New Testament were wholly destitute of plan in selecting those manuscripts, out of which they were to form the text of their printed editions. In the sequel it will appear, that they were not altogether ignorant of two classes of manuscripts; one of which contains the text which we have adopted from them; and the other that text which has been adopted by M. Griesbach.

Regarding Erasmus, Nolan stated:
Nor let it be conceived in disparagement of the great undertaking of Erasmus, that he was merely fortuitously right. Had he barely undertaken to perpetuate the tradition on which he received the sacred text he would have done as much as could be required of him, and more than sufficient to put to shame the puny efforts of those who have vainly labored to improve upon his design. [...] With respect to Manuscripts, it is indisputable that he was acquainted with every variety which is known to us, having distributed them into two principal classes, one of which corresponds with the Complutensian edition, the other with the Vatican manuscript. And he has specified the positive grounds on which he received the one and rejected the other. 

The Textus Receptus was defended by John William Burgon in his The Revision Revised (1881) and also by Edward Miller in A Guide to the Textual Criticism of the New Testament (1886). Burgon supported his arguments with the opinion that the Codex Alexandrinus and Codex Ephraemi were older than the Sinaiticus and the Vaticanus; and also that the Peshitta translation into Syriac (which supports the Byzantine Text) originated in the 2nd century. Miller's arguments in favour of readings in the Textus Receptus were of the same kind. However, both Burgon and Miller believed that although the Textus Receptus was to be preferred to the Alexandrian Text, it still required to be corrected in certain readings against the manuscript tradition of the Byzantine text. In that judgement, they are criticised by Edward F. Hills, who argues that the principle that God provides truth through scriptural revelation also must imply that God must ensure a preserved transmission of the correct revealed text, continuing into the Reformation era of biblical translation and printing. For Hills, the task of biblical scholarship is to identify the particular line of preserved transmission through which God is acting; a line that he sees in the specific succession of manuscript copying, textual correction and printing, which culminated in the Textus Receptus and the King James Bible. Hills argues that the principle of providentially-preserved transmission guarantees that the printed Textus Receptus must be the closest text to the Greek autographs and so he rejects readings in the Byzantine Majority Text where they are not maintained in the Textus Receptus. He goes so far as to conclude that Erasmus must have been providentially guided when he introduced Latin Vulgate readings into his Greek text; and even argues for the authenticity of the Comma Johanneum.

Hence the true text is found not only in the text of the majority of the New Testament manuscripts but more especially in the Textus Receptus and in faithful translations of the Textus Receptus, such as the King James Version. In short, the Textus Receptus represents the God-guided revision of the majority text. 

Hills was the first textual critic to defend the Textus Receptus. Although others have defended it per se, they are not acknowledged textual critics (such as Theodore Letis and David Hocking) or their works are not on a scholarly level (such as Terence H. Brown and D. A. Waite).

Relationship to Byzantine text 
The Textus Receptus was mainly established on a basis of manuscripts of the Byzantine text-type, also called 'Majority text', and usually is identified with it by its followers. However, in addition, over many years, Erasmus had extensively annotated New Testament citations in early Fathers, such as Augustine and Ambrose, whose biblical quotations more frequently conformed to the Western text-type; and he drew extensively on these citations (and also on the Vulgate) in support of his choice of Greek readings.

F. H. A. Scrivener (1813–1891) remarked that at Matt. 22:28; 23:25; 27:52; 28:3, 4, 19, 20; Mark 7:18, 19, 26; 10:1; 12:22; 15:46; Luke 1:16, 61; 2:43; 9:1, 15; 11:49; John 1:28; 10:8; 13:20, Erasmus followed the readings of Minuscule 1 (Caesarean text-type). Scrivener showed that some texts were incorporated from the Vulgate (for example, Acts 9:6). Daniel B. Wallace enumerated that in 1,838 places (1,005 are translatable) the Textus Receptus differs from the Byzantine text-type.

Minuscule 1rK, Erasmus's only text source for the Book of Revelation, is a manuscript of the Andreas commentary and not a continuous text manuscript.  It was not always easy for Erasmus to distinguish this manuscript's commentary text from its biblical source text.  The Andreas text is recognised as related to the Byzantine text in Revelation; but most textual critics nevertheless consider it to be a distinct text-type.

Dean Burgon, a great influential supporter of the Textus Receptus, declared that it needs correction. He suggested 150 corrections in its Gospel of Matthew alone.

 Matthew 10:8 it has Alexandrian reading νεκροὺς ἐγείρετε (raise the dead) omitted by the Byzantine text.
 Acts 20:28 it has Alexandrian reading τοῦ Θεοῦ (of God) instead of Byzantine τοῦ Κυρίου καὶ Θεοῦ (of the Lord and God).

English translations from the Textus Receptus 
 Tyndale New Testament 1526–1530
 Coverdale Bible 1535
 Matthew Bible 1537
 Taverner's Bible 1539
 Great Bible 1539
 Geneva Bible 1560-1644
 Bishops' Bible 1568
 Douay–Rheims Bible 1582, 1610, 1749-52. Base translation is from the Vulgate but 1749-1752 editions onwards (Challoner revisions) contain major borrowings from the Tyndale, Geneva and King James versions.
King James Version 1611, 1613, 1629, 1664, 1701, 1744, 1762, 1769, 1850
 English Dort Version 1657, English translation of the Statenvertaling by Theodore Haak
 Quaker Bible 1764
 Webster's Revision 1833
 Young's Literal Translation (YLT) 1862, 1887, 1898
 Rotherham's Emphasized Bible (EBR) 1872 edition.
 Cambridge Paragraph Bible 1873 edition of the KJV in paragraph format, edited by F. H. A. Scrivener.
 Julia E. Smith Parker Translation 1876
 New King James Version (NKJV) 1982 (New Testament 1979). With an anglicized version originally known as the "Revised Authorized Version".
 Green's Literal Translation 1985. Included in The Interlinear Translation 1986.
 Third Millennium Bible 1998
 New Cambridge Paragraph Bible 2005 edition of the KJV, paragraph format with modernised spelling; edited by David Norton.
 Modern English Version 2014
 Literal Standard Version 2020

See also 
 Other text-types
 Alexandrian text-type
 Other articles
 Minuscule 177 – manuscript close to Textus Receptus
 King-James-Only Movement
 Textual criticism
 Biblical manuscripts
 List of major textual variants in the New Testament

References

Sources 
 Martin Arhelger, Die Textgrundlage des Neues Testaments, 2006 
 Martin Arhelger, Die Textgrundlage des Neuen Testaments (2008), pp. 74–79 – differences between editions of Textus Receptus
 Bruce M. Metzger, Bart D. Ehrman, The Text of the New Testament: Its Transmission, Corruption and Restoration, Oxford University Press, 2005.
 Jacob van Bruggen. The Ancient Text of the New Testament. Winnipeg, Man.: Premier, 1976. 
 Pickering, Wilbur N. The Identity of the New Testament Text. Rev. ed. Nashville, Tenn.: T. Nelson Publishers, 1980.  pbk.
 W. W. Combs, Erasmus and the textus receptus, DBSJ 1 (Spring 1996): 35-53.
 Daniel B. Wallace, Some Second Thoughts on the Majority Text. Bibliotheca Sacra 146 (1989): 270-290.
 Dr James White. King James Only Controversy, Can You Trust the Modern Translations? Bethany House, 1995.
 Dr. Edward F. Hills. The King James Version Defended. Des Moines, Iowa, The Christian Research Press, 1984. An online version of Dr. Hills' book is available here and here.
 Martin Heide: Der einzig wahre Bibeltext? Erasmus von Rotterdam und die Frage nach dem Urtext, 5. Auflage Nürnberg: VTR, 2006, .
 H. J. de Jonge, Daniel Heinsius and the Textus Receptus of the New Testament
 S. P. Tregelles, The Printed Text of the Greek New Testament, London 1854.

External links 
 Text
 Robert Estienne, Novum Testamentum Græce (1550)
 Abraham Elzevir, Elzevir Textus Receptus (1624)
 Scrivener, Novum Testamentum : textus Stephanici A.D. 1550 : accedunt variae lectiones editionum Bezae, Elzeviri, Lachmanni, Tischendorfii, Tregellesii (Cambridge 1877)
 Scrivener, Novum Testamentum : Textus Stephanici A.D. 1550 : accedunt variae lectiones editionum Bezae, Elzeviri, Lachmanni, Tischendorfii, Tregellesii, Westcott-Hort, Versionis Anglicanae Emendatorum (1887)

 Modern textual criticism
 The Textus Receptus at the Encyclopedia of Textual Criticism
 Westcott & Hort vs. Textus Receptus from Bible Research
 The Majority Text Compared to the Received Text Bible Research
 Comparison of the Textus Receptus with other manuscript editions on the Manuscript Comparator

 Defense of Textus Receptus
 A Brief Look at the Textus Receptus
 Is the Received Text Based on a Few Late Manuscripts?
 A Wiki Style site promoting the Textus Receptus and the King James Version
 Bible For Today
 Dean Burgon Society

Books by Desiderius Erasmus
Christian terminology
Greek New Testament
King James Only movement
New Testament editions